The Penguin versions of the works of D. H. Lawrence reproduce the scholarly editions originally published by Cambridge University Press without some of the specialist editorial apparatus. They are based on the most accurate versions of the texts, and include a critical essay of introduction; bibliography of criticism; explanatory notes; alternative and missing chapters; and glossaries of dialect terms where required. The titles are widely available in a cheap paperback format.

Penguin has a long association with the publication of Lawrence's work, most notably the first unexpurgated paperback edition of Lady Chatterley's Lover that led to a prosecution for obscenity in the early 1960s.

Works by D. H. Lawrence